Park Road may refer to:

 Park Road, Loughborough, a cricket Ground in Loughborough, Leicestershire, England
 Park Road railway station, Brisbane, a railway station in Brisbane, Queensland, Australia
 Park Road Post, a motion picture post production facility in Miramar, New Zealand
 Park Road, Buxton, a cricket ground in Buxton, England 
 Park Road Shopping Center, an open area strip mall located in Charlotte, North Carolina
 Park Road, Kyiv (Parkova doroha), a street in Pechersk Raion of Kyiv
 Park Road (TV series), a Danish comedy-drama-series that debuted in 2009
Park road Liverpool 
 Park Road, Hong Kong, a major road in Mid-Levels in Hong Kong
 Park Road, Singapore